Byron Mitchell is a retired American soccer defender who played professionally in the USL A-League and National Professional Soccer League.

Mitchell graduated from Cape Henry Collegiate School, a secondary school in Virginia Beach, Virginia.  He attended Old Dominion University, playing on the men's soccer team in 1991, 1992, 1994 and 1995.  In addition to playing for Old Dominion, Mitchell spent the summer of 1994 with the Hampton Roads Hurricanes of the USISL and the summer of 1995 with the Roanoke River Dawgs of the USISL Premier League.  In January 1995, the Canton Invaders selected Mitchell in the National Professional Soccer League Draft, but Mitchell did not sign with them.  In 1996, Mitchell rejoined the Hurricanes, now known as the Hampton Roads Mariners playing in the USISL Select League.  In 1997, Mitchell moved up to the Carolina Dynamo of the USISL A-League.  That fall, he began his indoor career with the St. Louis Ambush of the National Professional Soccer League.  On January 1, 1998, the Ambush traded Mitchell and Cash to the Cincinnati Silverbacks in exchange for Franklin McIntosh.  On February 5, 1998, Mitchell signed with the Hampton Roads Mariners for the 1998 summer season. He would play both the 1998 and 1999 seasons with them.  In the fall of 1998, Mitchell moved to his third indoor team, the Harrisburg Heat.  On March 19, 1999, the Heat traded Mitchell and Jim Hesch to the Buffalo Blizzard for Bernie Lilavois.  He continued to play for Buffalo in the 1999–2000 season.  Mitchell did not play the 2000–2001 indoor season.  In August 2001, the Cleveland Crunch selected Mitchell in the Major Indoor Soccer League dispersal draft.  On March 21, 2002, Mitchell joined the Atlanta Silverbacks of the USL A-League.

2002–2003 Atlanta Silverbacks  44 (0)

References

Living people
1972 births
American soccer players
Atlanta Silverbacks players
Buffalo Blizzard players
North Carolina Fusion U23 players
Cincinnati Silverbacks players
Cleveland Crunch (2001–2002 MISL) players
Virginia Beach Mariners players
Harrisburg Heat players
Major Indoor Soccer League (2001–2008) players
National Professional Soccer League (1984–2001) players
Old Dominion Monarchs men's soccer players
St. Louis Ambush (1992–2000) players
USISL Select League players
USL League Two players
A-League (1995–2004) players
USISL players
Soccer players from Long Beach, California
Soccer players from Virginia Beach
Association football defenders